John Pitcairn Mackintosh (24 August 1929 – 30 July 1978) was a Scottish academic, author and Labour politician known for his advocacy of political devolution, at a time when it was anathema to the Labour leadership, and for his pro-Europeanism. He advanced the concept of dual nationality: that Scots could be both Scottish and British, and indeed European. He was the Member of Parliament (MP) for Berwick and East Lothian from 1966 to February 1974 and again from October 1974 until his death.

Early life and career
Mackintosh was born in Simla, India, and raised in Edinburgh. He was educated at Melville College, the University of Edinburgh, Balliol College, Oxford, and Princeton University. He was senior lecturer in government at the University of Ibadan, Nigeria from 1961 to 1963, and became Professor of Politics at the University of Strathclyde.

Political career
Mackintosh contested Edinburgh Pentlands in 1959 and Berwick and East Lothian in 1964. He was elected Member of Parliament for Berwick and East Lothian in 1966, as Labour won a landslide victory nationwide. In the February 1974 general election against the national trend, he lost his seat to the Conservative Michael Ancram, but regained it merely months later at the October 1974 election.

Later in life, Mackintosh became Chair and Professor of Politics at the University of Edinburgh, where he managed to balance his duties in the House of Commons with teaching students, a role he enjoyed. He was a strong supporter of formal lectures and would deliver his remarks written out all in longhand. This style of presentation did his students no harm: during the last year of his life he taught an introductory undergraduate course on political philosophy in 20 lectures; at the end of this series, the students gave him a standing ovation.

He wrote widely in the academic press and also for the educated general reader. He first wrote on devolution in 1966, publishing The Devolution of Power. His best known book, however, was The British Cabinet, first published in 1968. Other works include: The Government and Politics of Britain (1970), revised twice; Nigerian Government and Politics (1968); and the edited British Prime Ministers in the Twentieth Century (1977).  He was a prolific academic writer and authored scores of academic analyses.

Mackintosh had a regular column in The Times and The Scotsman newspapers. He was an accomplished broadcaster and lecturer, appearing regularly on television and giving public lectures. He was also the editor of The Political Quarterly, and chairman of the Hansard Society.

Personal life and death
While in Ibadan, Mackintosh met Una Maclean, a doctor and anthropologist; they married in 1963. They had two children of their own, in addition to two children he had from a prior marriage (to Janette Robertson, one of his former students) and three children she had from a prior marriage.

In July 1977, Mackintosh was admitted to the Royal Free Hospital in London for an unspecified medical condition. Shortly thereafter, he lost consciousness on a flight from London to Edinburgh. He underwent heart surgery at the Royal Infirmary of Edinburgh, though his health continued to decline after; on 24 July 1978, he collapsed at his home after experiencing chest pains, and died at Western General Hospital in Edinburgh six days later, on 30 July, at the age of 48. In the ensuing by-election to the Berwick and East Lothian constituency, his seat was won by John Home Robertson.

Legacy
Mackintosh was a forceful proponent of devolution to Scotland. He famously said in the House of Commons in 1976: "People in Scotland want a degree of government for themselves. It is not beyond the wit of man to devise the institutions to meet these demands." This quote is engraved on the threshold of the Donald Dewar Room at Holyrood. The late Donald Dewar, First Minister of Scotland, said of John Mackintosh's lifelong belief in devolution:

"His ideas had a lasting influence. ....[He] was a powerful advocate for devolution...John was something of a prophet, a mighty champion of reform at a time when constitutional change was not an approved and certainly not a fashionable cause. At the core he always placed democratic control, the empowering of the people. He did not base his argument on nationalism. It was not the glorification of the Nation state. It was never Scotland right or wrong. His vision was good government, an equitable democracy, that borrowed, elevated, created opportunity for the citizen."

A memorial lecture was founded by Arthur Greenan, his friends in the constituency and colleagues in Edinburgh University. The lecture is held every year, alternating between East Lothian and Edinburgh University. Past speakers have included Jack McConnell, John Kenneth Galbraith, Neil Kinnock, John Smith, Donald Dewar, and Gordon Brown, among others.

Mackintosh's focus on Scottish devolution has also been discussed in The Scotsman by Iain Gray, former leader of Scottish Labour.

After his death, two volumes of essays were published: Mackintosh on Scotland, edited by Henry Drucker (1982), and Mackintosh on Parliament and Social Democracy, edited by David Marquand (1983).

Further reading
 Storrar, William (1982), No Room, No Birth, Some Magi, in Hearn, Sheila G. (ed.), Cencrastus No. 10, Autumn 1982, pp. 3 – 8,

References

Sources
Times Guide to the House of Commons October 1974

External links
 

1929 births
1978 deaths
20th-century British non-fiction writers
20th-century Scottish male writers
20th-century essayists
Academic journal editors
Academics of the University of Edinburgh
Academics of the University of Strathclyde
Alumni of Balliol College, Oxford
Alumni of the University of Edinburgh
British expatriates in Nigeria
Members of the Parliament of the United Kingdom for Scottish constituencies
People educated at Stewart's Melville College
People from Shimla
Politicians from Edinburgh
Politics of East Lothian
Politics of the Scottish Borders
Princeton University alumni
Scottish Labour MPs
Scottish columnists
Scottish essayists
Scottish magazine editors
Scottish political scientists
Scottish political writers
Scottish scholars and academics
The Times people
UK MPs 1966–1970
UK MPs 1970–1974
UK MPs 1974–1979
Academic staff of the University of Ibadan
20th-century political scientists